John Buchanan (15 March 1899 – 3 October 1947) was a Scottish professional footballer.

Playing career
Buchanan was a versatile player who settled at right half, but could also play at the back or in attack. He started with Johnstone (then a senior team) and moved to St Mirren in 1919, and then to Morton in the summer of 1921. With regular centre-forward George French absent through injury, he led the attack in the Greenock club's surprise Scottish Cup victory of 1922, defeating Rangers 1–0 in the final.

He stayed at Cappielow until December 1927, by which time Morton had been relegated from the top division, then joined Rangers who at that time were dominating Scottish football. He soon won further honours, including the next four Scottish Football League championships, two Charity Cups, a Glasgow Cup and the Scottish Cup in 1928 and 1930; the 1929 final, however, would be remembered for Buchanan being sent off in the defeat by Kilmarnock.

He moved to Linfield in Northern Ireland for the 1931–32 season, winning another League medal and reaching the Irish Cup Final, then played out a last season with East Stirlingshire before retiring in 1933. He had a grocery business, but died relatively young in 1947.

References

External links

1899 births
1947 deaths
Scotland international footballers
Johnstone F.C. players
Rangers F.C. players
St Mirren F.C. players
Greenock Morton F.C. players
Linfield F.C. players
East Stirlingshire F.C. players
Scottish footballers
Association football utility players
Association football wing halves
Scottish Football League players
Footballers from Paisley, Renfrewshire
Place of death missing
NIFL Premiership players